Usha was a city in the Western part of Galilee. The Arab village of Hawsha later occupied the ruins of the old site. The modern kibbutz of Usha, Israel is located nearby to the ruins.

History
The site came to renown in the 2nd century (c. 135), after the Hadrianic persecutions, when the Sanhedrin, or rabbinic court, was moved from Yavne in Judea to Usha, and then from Usha back to Yavne, and a second time from Yavne to Usha. The Sanhedrin is thought to have continued there until it was dissolved during the reign of Verus, and re-established in Shefar'am under Marcus Aurelius.

The final settlement in Usha indicates the ultimate spiritual supremacy of Galilee over Judea, the latter having become depopulated after the Second Jewish Revolt. Usha was also important because some of the pupils of Rabbi Akiva resided there, including Rabbi Shimon Bar Yochai, Judah ben Ilai, whose original home was in Usha, Rabbi Yossi, and Rabbi Meir. The site received prominence after a Talmudic passage which names the boundary between Usha and Shefaram as the place where Rabbi Judah ben Bava met his death after ordaining seven elders and disciples of Rabbi Akiva.

Rabbinic enactments made at Usha

The rabbis who settled in Usha were active in making many reforms, under the leadership of Rabban Shimon ben Gamliel. They ruled in favor of several legal enactments, such as making it compulsory upon Jewish fathers to support their small children by providing sustenance unto them, until they were able to provide for themselves, and that if the President of a Court (Av Beit Din) was known to have transgressed, he was not to be excommunicated as a first resort, but rather asked to simply "show self-respect" by resigning his post. If he persisted in the same act, only then would he be excommunicated by the community.

The court at Usha also ruled that if a wife, during the life of her husband, conveyed any of her private possessions to another, her husband has got the first right of refusal and may recover such items from the hands of the purchaser. The court, moreover, augmented the earlier rabbinic decrees concerning the defilement of foreign lands, making the air-space of foreign lands capable of disqualifying the Terumah (heave-offering eaten by the priests of Aaron's lineage), and that, if it had made contact with the earth from the same lands, required it to be burnt.

Likewise, the court passed a law making it unlawful for any person to be wasteful with his own money, goods or property, and that he is not to expend more than one-fifth (20%) in charitable or philanthropic causes.
The rabbis of Usha also decided in the case of citron fruits that their time of picking determined their tithing status and bi'ur (time of removal). For example, if they were picked during any time of the regular yearly cycle, they are deemed as not having Seventh-year sanctity, even if picked one day following the Seventh-year and had grown during the Seventh-year. If picked at the very onset of the Seventh-year, even though they grew in an ordinary year, they are deemed as Seventh-year produce and the laws of removal (bi'ur) would apply to them.

Rabbi Yehudah ben Ilai recalled that, in his youth, he stood up on Purim to read from the Scroll of Esther in his hometown of Usha, and that he was not rebuked by the Sages for doing so publicly, and as a mere child. The exemplum shown by the Sages led to an easing of strictures, whereby youth, from that time forward, were permitted to read the Megillah ("Scroll of Esther") in public.

Archaeology

In 2004, a survey of the site was made by the Israel Antiquities Authority (IAA). In 2013, two archaeological survey-excavations were conducted at the ancient ruin by Abdallah Massarwa and Alla Nagorski on behalf of the Israel Antiquities Authority. In 2014, the site continued to be excavated by four individual teams. In October of 2019, the IAA published the discovery of a Byzantine-era hammer and nails discovered at Usha, by which finds it is thought that the town's inhabitants worked in metallurgy.

In 2009, Hurvat Usha was declared a National Park of Israel, an area spanning over 263 dunams (nearly 65 acres).

See also
Beit She'arim (Roman-era Jewish village)
Hawsha

References

External links

Archeological world (with photos of ruins of Usha)

Jews and Judaism in the Roman Empire
Talmud places
Former populated places in Israel
Ancient Jewish settlements of Galilee
Ancient Jewish history